Class 1 may refer to:

 Class I railroad, a term used in North American railroad size classification
 Class 1 Touring Cars, an FIA classification for cars in motor racing
 Class 1 World Powerboat Championship
 Classes of U.S. Senators
 SCORE Class 1, unlimited off-road racing buggies
 The first class in terms of hiking difficulty in the Yosemite Decimal System
 A contribution class in the National Insurance system in the UK
 An IEC protection class in the electrical appliance manufacturing industry
 A class in laser safety

See also 
 Class I (disambiguation)
 Class 01 (disambiguation)
 First class (disambiguation)
 NSB El 1, an electric locomotive of Norway
 NSB Di 1, a diesel locomotive of Norway